Wheatley is a fictional artificial intelligence from the Portal franchise, first introduced in the 2011 video game Portal 2. He is voiced by British comedian and writer Stephen Merchant, and created in part by Portal 2s designer Erik Wolpaw.

In the Portal narrative, Wheatley is one of several spherical "personality cores" developed to restrain GLaDOS, the main artificial intelligence that operates the Aperture Science facility, from becoming rampant, though Wheatley is later revealed to have been built to act as an "intelligence dampener" towards GLaDOS to hampering her capability for thought. Initially serving as a comedic foil to the player-character Chell during the first half of Portal 2, Wheatley becomes the main antagonist of the second half as he takes GLaDOS's place and wreaks havoc on the facility before Chell and GLaDOS cooperate stop him. In addition to Portal 2, Wheatley has appeared in Team Fortress 2 and Lego Dimensions. 

Since his appearance in Portal 2, Wheatley has received overwhelmingly positive reception from critics. Merchant has been praised for his portrayal by critics who cited his fast-talking dialogue. Wheatley has also been described as a contrast to GLaDOS's "slower-speaking and more deliberate" personality.

Concept and creation
Wheatley was first revealed in an alternate reality game released by Valve, the developer of the Portal series, in a screenshot of Portal 2 before its release, showing the player-character Chell holding him. Wheatley came from combining several ideas from multiple "personality cores" that the player would meet throughout the game. The idea was removed as it supposedly made the game feel too cluttered and the player never got to really learn about the multiple robots, so several were combined into the character of Wheatley. Wheatley was designed with the purpose of making a character who "you’d be seeing a lot". Erik Wolpaw added that Wheatley served as an "offset" of GLaDOS; while her voice is "slower-speaking and more deliberate", Wheatley is a "frantic person", which Erik says is performed well by Merchant due to being able to relay information quickly in his speech.

Merchant was chosen for the role both because the designers were fans of British comedy and because of Merchant's role in the television series Extras and his podcasts. Merchant was sent a package of Portal 2 material along with a request that he provide the voice of Wheatley. Merchant agreed to the role. Wheatley's characterisation was always designed with a British voice in mind. While they were writing Wheatley's dialogue, they had Merchant "in their heads" as a result of watching Extras, though at the time they did not consider pursuing him for the role because they did not think that they would be able to cast him. They were instead considering Richard Ayoade, up until they went to Merchant's agents.

Wheatley was also designed with the intention of writing a video game character who spoke informally which Wolpaw stated gave the sensation that the events were really happening and that this was something players do not often see in video games. He also stated that sidekicks in video games have never "sounded as if they were just making things up as you go along". While they later discovered that Merchant was famous in the United Kingdom, they noted that he was not chosen for his fame. Wolpaw noted that Merchant was the most famous actor that they had featured in one of their games. While they wrote a script for Wheatley, Merchant had an "improvisational style" that they let him employ in the dialogue. Merchant also spoke some of the written dialogue in a way that seemed improvisational, such as in the "reading and repetition of words". This was one of the qualities that made them want to cast Merchant.

Merchant himself has compared Wheatley's personality to characters typically played by Woody Allen, and noted that while initially he didn't know the gravitas of the role, reaction by others made him take the role a lot more seriously. He described the recording sessions as "exhausting", so much so that by the end he was "not looking forward to it", but once the project wrapped, he was overwhelmed with the fan response and would return for a sequel.

Original plans had Wheatley remain dead after being crushed by GLaDOS in the first chapter of the game, with her remaining as the main antagonist. The player would then meet six other spheres—including a paranoid sphere and a "Morgan Freeman sphere". This was changed, however, as the other spheres did not have enough time for the players to grow attached to them, and because playtesters missed Wheatley.

Appearances

Portal 2
Wheatley is one of several personality cores created for GLaDOS; specifically, he was designed by the Aperture scientists as an "Intelligence Dampening Sphere" (or, as GLaDOS puts it, "the dumbest moron who ever lived") as a means to hamper GLaDOS's decision-making processes by injecting poor judgment into her routines.

The player-character Chell is introduced to Wheatley when he revives her from her cryonic hibernation, with the intent on helping her escape the deteriorating Aperture Science facility. Wheatley then helps Chell find a portal gun. Wheatley leads Chell to the chamber containing the remains of GLaDOS, and accidentally reactivates GLaDOS while trying to engineer their escape. Chell is separated from Wheatley by GLaDOS and forced to perform more tests. Wheatley manages to rediscover Chell and helps her escape to maintenance areas behind the testing chambers out of GLaDOS's reach.  He guides her to destroy GLaDOS's neurotoxin supply and sabotage the turret manufacturing line before returning to GLaDOS. Without these hazards to stop her, Chell follows his instructions to transfer his core into that of GLaDOS. With the threat of GLaDOS quenched, Wheatley prepares to send Chell to the surface, but he becomes power-hungry due to GLaDOS's core programming; he places GLaDOS's personality into a module powered by a potato battery and sends her and Chell into the depths of Aperture Science. As Chell and GLaDOS fall, GLaDOS reveals that Wheatley was actually meant to be a "tumor", with the purpose of generating an endless stream of bad ideas in order to control her.

While Chell and GLaDOS work their way up from deep underground, Wheatley begins fumblingly experimenting with his control of the facility, causing several key systems to fail. By the time Chell and GLaDOS arrive, the core reactor in the facility is set to overload, and the only way to stop it is for GLaDOS to retake her main unit back from Wheatley. Wheatley, coerced by the core programming in GLaDOS, puts them through a series of deranged test chambers in his newly renamed "Wheatley Science" facility, leading them to a series of death traps. Chell and GLaDOS are able to escape, due to Wheatley's lack of foresight, and make their way to his chamber to try to attempt a reversal of the core transfer, but first must subdue his programming by three other faulty personality cores to distract him.

Wheatley, recalling the earlier battle with GLaDOS, takes steps to prevent Chell from activating the core transfer mechanism and assaults her with bombs.  However, he did not account for tubes carrying the various gels through the room, which Chell destroys with the bombs and uses the resulting spillage to complete the attachment of the corrupted cores. With Wheatley distracted, Chell tries to initiate the core transfer, however bombs rigged in the stalemate resolution annex explode before this can take place. As the failsafes on the reactor core fail, the roof collapses. Chell creates a portal between the room and the moon's surface, dragging her and Wheatley's module through it; GLaDOS, now having regained her body, knocks Wheatley away, and then restores the facility to normal working order.  Wheatley is shown in the game's epilogue to be floating adrift in space, apologetic for the trouble he has caused, and forced to listen to the deranged ramblings of the space personality core.

Other games
Wheatley appears in an official plug-in created by Valve for The Elder Scrolls V: Skyrim; Fall of the Space Core, Vol 1. Wheatley appears floating around the Skills Menu, the backdrop of which is a series of constellations in potato.

Wheatley appears in Valve's multiplayer shooter Team Fortress 2 as an item for the Spy class called "The Ap-Sap". Stephen Merchant reprised his role as Wheatley for the game.

He appears as a non-playable character in Lego Dimensions, with Stephen Merchant once again reprising his role. In the main story campaign, he appears in Aperture Science and occasionally aids Batman, Gandalf and Wyldstyle in escaping and surviving GLaDOS's traps. In the bonus Portal-themed stage, Wheatley is now able to move and levitate under his own power; he is reunited with Chell and accompanies her through GLaDOS's new test chambers, expressing remorse for his previous actions and trying to ingratiate himself with Chell. He also appears in the Portal 2 adventure world, caring for a group of Frankenturrets and offering the player various sidequests.

He also appears in Rocket League as an antenna that can be equipped to the car of the player's choice.

Reception

Stephen Merchant won two awards for his performance as Wheatley: 'Outstanding Character Performance' at the Interactive Achievement Awards and Best Performance by a Human Male at the 2011 Spike Video Game Awards. Wheatley earned a Spike TV nomination for 'Character of the Year'.

Edge staff wrote that Merchant's portrayal of Wheatley was "neurotically stuttering and blubbering" and that his "idiosyncratic staccato Bristolian burr" was a "fascinating choice". Edge staff also wrote that he served as the game's "comic relief" and called him "alternately hapless and sinister, the mesmerizing animations of his 'eye light' and a changing role throughout make him an unforgettable presence". GameSpy's Will Tuttle wrote that Merchant's portrayal of Wheatley was "pitch perfect" and is "sure to be a fan favorite". The Telegraphs Tom Hoggins wrote that the "delightfully skittish" Wheatley's "casual, nervous patter reacting naturally to the events unfolding around you" was performed well by Merchant. He later wrote that the dialogue of Portal 2 was funny due in part to "the way that the frantic, nervous babble of Wheatley contrasts so effectively with the cynical, sinister goading from GLaDOS" and that neither are overbearing. The Guardians Nick Cowen wrote that Wheatley was a "stammering, motor-mouthed droid" and at times "funny and monstrous and spine chilling". The Guardians Will Freeman wrote that the "apparently sentient computers" in Portal 2 are "outstanding" though players may have a "divided opinion" on Wheatley.

An editor for The Province wrote that Merchant's portrayal of Wheatley "really adds to the personality and character of the game". Official Xbox Magazines Jon Hicks praised the narrative of Portal 2 and cited Wheatley's "chirpy idiocy" as a contributing factor to its quality. OXMs Ryan McCaffrey wrote that Wheatley was "played to perfection" by Merchant. Computer and Video Games Andy Robinson wrote that Wheatley's personality was "equally loud" to GLaDOS and "brilliant". GameZone Ben PerLee wrote that Wheatley was "cute but stupid" and called him "adorable and bumbling, a lovable little guy who is much more involved than you might expect". The Escapists Russ Pitts wrote that Wheatley was "a helpful – if dumb – robot companion with a chipper English accent". The Globe and Mails Chad Sapieha wrote that Merchant was "enormously entertaining as a slow-witted sphere". Ars Technica Ben Kuchera wrote that "the casting [of Merchant] was a brilliant choice". He also wrote that "there is something about his delivery that works wonderfully, and it seems like he was having a good time recording his lines". Kevin Wong of Complex included Wheatley to his "best supporting character in video games", and stated that "It's hard to get angry at, or form any kind of emotional connection to, something that has no face. Wheatley, however, makes up for his lack of humanity with dry, British repartee." Guinness World Records Gamer's Edition listed Wheatley as 37th in their list of "top 50 video game villains". TheGamer also included Wheatley on their "Iconic Video Game Characters", stating that "Wheatley is a fantastic villain, and his unique humor made him a fan-favorite character among the Portal fan base."

PC Gamers Dan Stapleton praised Wheatley as "fantastically voiced" by Merchant and wrote that he was "basically playing the same mind-bogglingly stupid character from the Ricky Gervais comedy Extras". PC Gamers Craig Pearson wrote that "his nervous English voice ... is another indicator that while Valve might not have known what they had with the original Portal, this time around they’re a lot more confident". Giant Bomb's Ryan Davis wrote that Merchant voiced Wheatley with "terrific nervous energy". Wireds Chris Kohler wrote that "you'll fall in love with Wheatley, a friendly robot with a heart of gold and the charming voice of actor Stephen Merchant". IGN Charles Onyett wrote that it's "difficult to overstate how Merchant's obvious enthusiasm for the role benefits the game" and that "no word Wheatley speaks is without witty inflection, and the consistently clever writing perfectly complements the onscreen action". He also wrote that Merchant's Wheatley "steals the show" while GLaDOS and Cave Johnson's voice actors Ellen McLain and J. K. Simmons turn in solid performances. PALGN Adam Ghiggino wrote that Merchant's performance was "brilliant" and that he has "a lot of emotion to [his] movement". Video Gamer Jamin Smith expressed that Merchant's voice was 'familiar' and wrote that Wheatley "possesses more personality than the cast of most other games put together" despite "a lack of any distinguishing features at all" in its appearance.

GamesRadar Tyler Wilde wrote that Wheatley was "surprisingly expressive" and called it "bumbling". CNN's Larry Frum called Wheatley "silly, frantic and almost childlike". ABC News' Lou Kesten called it "equally memorable" to GLaDOS and a "chatty, nervous A.I." Entertainment Weeklys John Young described its eyeball's appearance as a "giant blue eyeball resembles a HAL 9000 computer with an Apple makeover". He also wrote that he was the "most delightful artificial-intelligence program one could hope to meet, and his witty quips and general clumsiness are a frequent source of amusement" and that he is "splendidly voiced" by Merchant. Editors for CNET wrote that "if Stephen Merchant doesn't win every video game voice actor award for his portrayal of the protagonist's wacky robot sidekick, there is no justice in either this world or any virtual one". An editor for CBS News wrote that Wheatley was "chirpy and well-intentioned" but also "dim-witted". The editor added that the "interactions between the player, GLaDOS and Wheatley are what give "Portal 2" its charm and provide much of the humor that keeps the game captivating puzzle after puzzle".

However, not all of Wheatley's reception has been positive; in an article by Ars Technica, Peter Bright stated that the character's role in the game's plot was "predictable" and that "his tireless, relentlessly stupid schtick" got old quickly, with the character's jokes being "repetitive", further stating that Wheatley's "inane babble served only to disrupt the mood".

References

Anthropomorphic video game characters
Artificial intelligence characters in video games
Male characters in video games
Portal characters
Robot characters in video games
Video game bosses
Video game characters introduced in 2011
Video game sidekicks